North Carolina Highway 153 (NC 153) is a  primary state highway in the U.S. state of North Carolina.  The highway serves as a spur of NC 152 into Landis.

Route description
NC 153 is a short two-lane highway that traverses , from NC 152 to Landis.

History
Established in 1930 as a new primary routing, from NC 152 to NC 15 (which later became US 170, followed by US 29 and US 29A before finally becoming a secondary road); little has changed since.

Junction list

References

External links

 
 NCRoads.com: N.C. 153

Transportation in Rowan County, North Carolina
153